Clare Michele Scriven is an Australian politician. She has been a Labor member of the South Australian Legislative Council since the 2018 state election.

Scriven was raised in Mount Gambier, before living and working in Adelaide for the Australian Electoral Commission from 2007. She later returned to Mount Gambier. She was previously the State Manager of the Australian Forest Products Association, and had post-graduate degrees in management and business. She and her husband Gerard has six children.

On 10 April 2018, Scriven was elevated to the Malinauskas Labor shadow cabinet as: Deputy Leader in the Legislative Council, Shadow Minister for Industry & Skills, and Shadow Minister for Forestry. Following the 2022 election, Scriven has served as the Minister for Primary Industries and Regional Development and Minister for Forest Industries in the Malinauskas ministry since March 2022. She is one of the two regional ministers in the cabinet, the other being Independent member Geoff Brock.

See also
Results of the South Australian state election, 2018 (Legislative Council)

References

Year of birth missing (living people)
Living people
Members of the South Australian Legislative Council
Women members of the South Australian Legislative Council
Australian Labor Party members of the Parliament of South Australia
Australian Institute of Business alumni
21st-century Australian politicians
21st-century Australian women politicians